Shanghai Industrial Holdings Limited or SIHL is a conglomerate company consisting of  real estate, infrastructure, medicine and consumer products businesses in Shanghai, China. The majority shareholder of SIHL is Shanghai Industrial Investment (Holdings), which is supervised by the Shanghai Government.

It was incorporated in Hong Kong and listed on the Hong Kong Stock Exchange in 1996.

External links
Shanghai Industrial Holdings

Government-owned companies of China
Conglomerate companies of China
Former companies in the Hang Seng Index
Companies based in Shanghai
Companies established in 1996
Companies listed on the Hong Kong Stock Exchange
Conglomerate companies of Hong Kong